The National Professional Soccer League (NPSL) was a North American professional soccer league that existed for only the 1967 season before merging with the United Soccer Association (USA) to form the North American Soccer League. It had ten charter members, nine from the United States and one from Canada. To encourage attacking play, the NPSL introduced a new standings points system that was later used by the NASL – 6 points for a win, 3 for a draw, 0 for a loss and 1 bonus point for each of the first three goals scored.  The circuit's commissioner was Ken Macker, an American publisher of three Philippines-based newspapers. The name National Professional Soccer League was revived in 1990 and used by a United States professional indoor soccer league.

Origins

In 1966 a group of sports entrepreneurs led by Bill Cox and Robert Hermann formed a consortium called the North American Professional Soccer League with the intention of forming a professional soccer league in United States and Canada. However this was just one of three groups with similar plans. The NAPSL eventually merged with one of these groups, the National Soccer League, led by Richard Millen, to form the National Professional Soccer League. A third group, the United Soccer Association was sanctioned by both the USSFA and FIFA. The NPSL did not receive sanctioning by the USSFA as they refused to pay the $25,000 fee, was branded an outlaw league by FIFA and players faced sanctions for signing with it. Despite this the NPSL, which secured a TV contract from CBS, set about recruiting players, and announced it would be ready to launch in 1967.

1967 season recap
The NPSL kicked off on Sunday, April 16 with a full slate of five matches attended by a total of 46,547 fans. The largest crowd of the day was found in Philadelphia, where 14,163 cheered the hometown Spartans to a 2–0 victory over the Toronto Falcons. The most notable game however, was Baltimore's 1–0 home victory over Atlanta in front of a crowd of just 8,434. It was televised by CBS which had signed a two-year contract to broadcast a game every Sunday afternoon live and in color. Play-by-play voice Jack Whitaker was joined by the former Northern Ireland international Danny Blanchflower as a pundit. Blanchflower was not impressed with the standard of play and did not hesitate to say so.

The NPSL was also criticised after Pittsburgh's 2–1 triumph over Toronto in the Falcons' home opener on Sunday, May 14. Of the twenty-one fouls that afternoon, eleven were called to allow CBS to insert commercials into its telecast. Referee Peter Rhodes also admitted that he had forced players to fake injuries to serve the same purpose. This raised many questions about whether the television networks and its sponsors were having too much influence over televised sporting events.

The NPSL did however attract some notable players including three former Aston Villa players Phil Woosnam, Vic Crowe and Peter McParland who, together with another veteran of the English League, Ron Newman all turned out for Atlanta Chiefs. Two ex-Real Madrid players, Juan Santisteban and Yanko Daucik, also turned out for Baltimore Bays and Toronto Falcons respectively. Santisteban made the NPSL All-Star team and Daucik finished as the league's top scorer.

The Oakland Clippers laid claim to the regular season title boasting both the best record and the most total points in either division. In the NPSL Finals the Western Division champion Clippers defeated the Bays, winners of the Eastern Division for the NPSL Championship by virtue of a 4–2 aggregate. Dennis Viollet gave Baltimore a 1–0 win on Sunday, September 3 before a home crowd of 16,619. Six days later, in the second leg at Oakland, Dragan Đukić scored a hat trick as the Clippers won 4–1 in front of 9,037.

On the same day as the second leg of the NPSL final, the St. Louis Stars defeated Philadelphia, 2–1, in a battle of division runner-ups held in St. Louis before a crowd of 9,565. The victory gave the Stars a birth in the Commissioner's Cup versus Oakland. On September 18, the Clippers completed the NPSL treble, by defeating the Stars for the Commissioner's Cup in front of 8,415 fans at Busch Memorial Stadium by the score of 6–3.

1967 Regular season
P= Played, W = Wins, L = Losses, T= Ties GF = Goals For, GA = Goals Against, Pts= point system

6 points for a win, 
3 points for a tie,
0 points for a loss,
1 point for each goal scored up to three per game.
-Premiers (most points). -Other playoff team.

NPSL League leaders
GP = Games Played, G = Goals (worth 2 points), A = Assists (worth 1 point), Pts = Points

NPSL All-Stars

NPSL Final 1967

1967 NPSL Champions: Oakland Clippers

NPSL Commissioner's Cup 1967
The Commissioner's Cup was a one-off challenge match between the NPSL Champion and the winner of a third-place match between the two division runners-up. On September 9 the St. Louis Stars defeated the Philadelphia Spartans 2–1 to secure their place in the match. Earlier that same day the Oakland Clippers were crowned NPSL champions with a, 4–2, two-match aggregate victory over the Baltimore Bays to claim the other cup spot.

Post season awards
Most Valuable Player: Rubén Navarro, Philadelphia
Rookie of the year: Willy Roy, Chicago

NASL formation
In December 1967, the NPSL merged with the United Soccer Association to form the North American Soccer League.  As a result of the merger several of the original NPSL franchises folded or relocated. This was partly to avoid some cities having two teams. Philadelphia Spartans and Pittsburgh Phantoms both folded, while Chicago Spurs became Kansas City Spurs and Los Angeles Toros became San Diego Toros. Together with New York Generals, Baltimore Bays, Atlanta Chiefs, Toronto Falcons, St. Louis Stars and Oakland Clippers, these teams then became founding members of the NASL. However, only Atlanta Chiefs, who won the inaugural NASL title, and St. Louis Stars enjoyed any longevity. The remaining franchises all folded by 1970.

NPSL players

References

External links
1966 in American soccer
1967 in American soccer
1968 in American soccer
1969 in American soccer
NASL Rosters

Bibliography
 Official 1968 North American Soccer League Guide. St. Louis: The Sporting News, 1968.
 Durso, Joseph. "Local Pro Soccer Teams May Share Stadium With Yanks in Spring", The New York Times, Sunday, February 12, 1967.

Defunct soccer leagues in the United States
Defunct soccer leagues in Canada
 
Soccer leagues in the United States